Benchill is an area in the Wythenshawe council estate  south of Manchester city centre, in England.

In 2000, Benchill was named in the Index of Multiple Deprivation as the most deprived ward in England.

Following a review by the Boundary Committee for England, Benchill was disestablished as a local government ward in 2003, and the area divided between the neighbouring wards of Sharston, Woodhouse Park, and Northenden.

Benchill gained national media attention in February 2007 when then-Leader of the Opposition David Cameron visited the estate and was targeted by a group of youths, one of whom made a gun gesture with his hand towards him. The incident was photographed by the press.

Services
Benchill tram stop, on the Airport Line, opened in 2014.

Benchill is policed by the Wythenshawe Neighbourhood Policing Team.

References

Areas of Manchester
History of Manchester
Wythenshawe